The Tomb of Zhang Yanghao also known as the Grave of Lord Zhang is a monument to the Yuan-Dynasty Sanqu poet Zhang Yanghao. It is located in a public park in Liu Yun Village within the urban area of Tianqiao District in the city of Jinan, Shandong, China.

The tomb's park covers an area of about 2,000 square meters and is planted with pines and willows. In addition to the tomb of Zhang Yanghao himself, it also contains the tombs of four of Zhang's relatives. The tomb of Zhang Yanghao consists of an earth mound that is 1.9 meter tall and surrounded by masonry walls. In front of the mound stand a stone altar and incense set. A spirit way with stone gates, lions, and turtles leads to the tomb.

The tomb has been inscribed into the list of protected cultural sites in Shandong since June 1992 (number 2-246).

References

See also
List of sites in Jinan
Major historical and cultural sites protected by Shandong Province

Tourist attractions in Jinan
Tombs in China